Parshuram Mishra (25 January 1894 – 4 August 1981) was an Indian botanist, educationist and the first vice chancellor of the Sambalpur University. He completed his college studies at the University of Calcutta in 1961 and secured a doctoral degree (PhD) from the University of Leeds, the first person from Odisha to secure a doctoral degree from the university. He is a former member of faculty at Leeds during which period he published several botanical articles. Returning to India, he became the vice chancellor of Utkal University. When the Government of Odisha started Sambalpur University in 1967, Mishra was made the first vice chancellor.

The Government of India honoured him in 1960, with the award of Padma Shri, the fourth highest Indian civilian award for his services to the nation. Dr. P. M. Institute of Advanced Study in Education, an institution started in 1988 for advanced studies in education is named after him.

Further reading

References

1894 births
1981 deaths
Recipients of the Padma Shri in literature & education
Scientists from Odisha
20th-century Indian educational theorists
Date of death missing
Indian scientific authors
Alumni of the University of Leeds
People from Bargarh district
20th-century Indian botanists
Sambalpur University alumni